Chenar (also Romanized as Chenār; also known as Chenaroo’eyeh and Chinār) is a village in Meymand Rural District, in the Central District of Shahr-e Babak County, Kerman Province, Iran. At the 2006 census, its population was 110, in 34 families.

References 

Populated places in Shahr-e Babak County